The Civil War Monuments in Washington, D.C. are a group of seventeen outdoor statues which are spread out through much of central and northwest Washington, D.C. The statues depict 11 Union generals and formerly included one Confederate general, Albert Pike, who was depicted as a Mason and not as a general. The Pike statue was torn down on Juneteenth 2020, as part of the George Floyd protests. Two Union admirals are honored, although Admiral Samuel Francis DuPont's statue was removed to Wilmington, Delaware, and he is now honored with a fountain. Other statues depict nuns, peace, emancipation, and the Grand Army of the Republic.

In accordance with Executive Order 11593 by President Richard Nixon, the National Park Service surveyed and registered the 18 Civil War statues in Washington, D.C. to aid in their preservation. They are listed as a group on the National Register of Historic Places.

The African American Civil War Memorial  was completed in 1997 and is not included in the group of historic statues.

Statues

Samuel Francis DuPont Memorial Fountain  
Nuns of the Battlefield 
Stephenson Grand Army of the Republic Memorial  
Peace Monument 
Ulysses S. Grant Memorial 
Major General James B. McPherson 
Admiral David G. Farragut 
Major General John A. Logan 
Major General George Henry Thomas 
Brevet Lt. General Winfield Scott 
General Winfield Scott Hancock    
General John A. Rawlins 
General Philip Sheridan 
Major General George B. McClellan 
General William Tecumseh Sherman Monument 
George Gordon Meade Memorial 
Emancipation Memorial 
Albert Pike Memorial  – no longer standing

See also

American Revolution Statuary
National Register of Historic Places listings in Washington, D.C.

References

External links

 
American Civil War military monuments and memorials
C
Monuments and memorials on the National Register of Historic Places in Washington, D.C.
Outdoor sculptures in Washington, D.C.